Armapur Estate is a census town in Kanpur Nagar District  in the state of Uttar Pradesh, India.

Demographics
 India census, Armapur Estate had a population of 20,797. Males constitute 54% of the population and females 46%. Armapur Estate has an average literacy rate of 80%, higher than the national average of 59.5%; with 59% of the males and 41% of females literate. 9% of the population is under 6 years of age. This census town is reserve for only defense personnel.

References

Cities and towns in Kanpur Nagar district